John Frederick Gill (? - 15 October 1899) was a Second Deemster of the Isle of Man.

Deemster Gill was born in Sicily but educated at King William's College. On leaving the College, he studied law with his second cousin Sir James Gell and was admitted to the bar in 1864.  He was elevated to the bench as Second Deemster in 1884.

He also compiled the Manx Statutes from 1417 to 1896 into 6 volumes - a painstaking task.  He took a great interest in religious, social, and archaeological matters, and was an ardent Manx patriot. He collaborated with his brother, W H Gill and Dr. Clague in the publication of the Manx National Song Book.

Offices of State

 Second Deemster, 1884-1899

Year of birth missing
1899 deaths
Manx judges
People educated at King William's College